Nazarovka is a rural locality (a settlement) in Dalny Selsoviet, Rubtsovsky District, Altai Krai, Russia. The population was 150 as of 2013. There are 2 streets.

Geography 
Nazarovka is located 36 km east of Rubtsovsk (the district's administrative centre) by road. Saratovka is the nearest rural locality.

References 

Rural localities in Rubtsovsky District